Caffe Mingo is an Italian restaurant in Portland, Oregon.

Description 
Caffe Mingo is an Italian restaurant on 21st Avenue in northwest Portland's Northwest District. Bar Mingo is an adjoining bar, and Mingo (also called Mingo West) is a sibling restaurant in Beaverton.

History 
The restaurant opened in 1991 and underwent a renovation in 2013. Caffe Mingo is owned by Michael Cronin.

Reception 
Giselle Smith rated the restaurant 2.5 out of 3 stars in Best Places Northwest: The Locals' Guide to the Best Restaurants, Lodgings, Sights, Shopping, and More! (2004).  In 2010, David Sarasohn of The Oregonian gave Caffe Mingo a rating of 'B+' and Mingo in Beaverton a 'B' rating. Samantha Bakall included Bar Mingo in the newspaper's 2014 list of the ten best happy hours in downtown Portland. The Oregonian's Michael Russell included the bar in 2017 lists of the city's ten best Italian restaurants and northwest Portland's ten best restaurants.

See also

 List of Italian restaurants

References

External links 

 
 Caffe Mingo at Frommer's
 Caffe Mingo at Zomato

1991 establishments in Oregon
Drinking establishments in Oregon
Italian restaurants in Portland, Oregon
Northwest District, Portland, Oregon
Restaurants established in 1991